Félix Ziem (26 February 1821 – 10 November 1911) was a French painter in the style of the Barbizon School, who also produced some Orientalist works.

Biography
He was born Félix-Francois Georges Philibert Ziem in Beaune in the Côte-d'Or département of the Burgundy région of France. His mother was a native of Burgundy who had married an immigrant from Croatia. Originally, Ziem planned to be an architect, studied in the  École des Beaux-Arts in Dijon, and for a time he worked as an architect. In 1839 he moved to Marseilles, where he received some informal instruction in painting from Adolphe Monticelli.

Painting developed from a hobby into a career following a visit in 1841 to Italy, where he fell in love with the city of Venice, a place that would become the source for many of his works, and to which he returned annually until 1892. Apart from Venetian scenes, he also painted many still lifes, portraits, and landscapes of diverse locations which reflected his travels. Following a year-long trip to the Ottoman Empire and Egypt in 1857-58, he began to include works with an Orientalist theme in his oeuvre. His landscapes included scenes from a variety of locations including Constantinople, Egypt, Martigues, Cagnes-sur-Mer and his native Burgundy. Ziem was a commercially successful artist in his own lifetime.

Career

Ziem's works were first exhibited in 1849 at the Paris Salon, and Ziem remained a regular exhibitor there for many years. He also traveled extensively throughout Europe and in 1860 moved to Montmartre, the artistic quarter of the city of Paris. Financially successful, he was known to assist struggling young artists.

In 1857, the government of France recognized his contribution to the art world by making him a Chevalier of the Legion of Honor, and an officer of the Legion in 1878.

Félix Ziem died in 1911 and was interred in the Père Lachaise Cemetery in Paris.

Selected paintings

See also
 List of Orientalist artists
 Orientalism

References

Sources
Poulet, A. L., & Murphy, A. R. (1979). Corot to Braque: French Paintings from the Museum of Fine Arts, Boston. Boston: The Museum. 

1821 births
1911 deaths
People from Beaune
19th-century French painters
French male painters
20th-century French painters
20th-century French male artists
French Realist painters
Orientalist painters
Burials at Père Lachaise Cemetery
Peintres de la Marine
Chevaliers of the Légion d'honneur
19th-century French male artists